The women's 4 × 400 metres relay event at the 2001 Summer Universiade was held at the Workers Stadium in Beijing, China on 1 September.

Results

References

Athletics at the 2001 Summer Universiade
2001